Events in the year 1941 in India.

Incumbents
 Emperor of India – George VI
 Viceroy of India – Victor Hope, 2nd Marquess of Linlithgow
 President of the Indian National Congress - Abul Kalam Azad

Events
 National income - 44,085 million
 June 21 - Rajendra Prasad lays the foundation stone of Scindia Shipyard at Visakhapatnam.

Law

 The Delhi Restriction of Uses of Land Act, 1941
 The Berar Laws Act, 1941

Births
1 January – Asrani, actor.
17 January – Bindu, actress.
25 March – Udyavara Madhava Acharya, writer, poet and actor (died 2020)
10 April – Mani Shankar Aiyar, politician and Minister.
2 July – Ashalata Wabgaonkar, actress (died 2020).
5 July – Nitin Desai, Under Secretary General, United Nations, 1993–2003
15 July – Nikhil Kumar, politician.
17 July – Bharathiraja, filmmaker.
31 July – Amarsinh Chaudhary, politician and Chief Minister of Gujarat (died 2004).
4 September – Sushilkumar Shinde, politician and Minister, former Chief Minister of Maharashtra.

Full date unknown
Nirmal Kumar Ganguly, medical scientist.
T S Krishnamurthy, civil servant, Chief Election Commissioner.
Yasmeen Lari, Architect

Deaths
28 March – Kavasji Jamshedji Petigara, first Indian to become the Deputy Commissioner of Police of the Mumbai Police (born 1877).
7 August – Rabindranath Tagore, poet, artist, playwright, novelist and composer (born 1861).
9 November – Ganganath Jha, scholar of Sanskrit, Indian philosophy and Buddhist philosophy (born 1872).

Full date unknown
Binodini Dasi, actress and writer (born 1862).

References

 
India
Years of the 20th century in India
India in World War II